HD 28527 is a star in the constellation Taurus, and a member of the Hyades open cluster. It is faintly visible to the naked eye with an apparent visual magnitude of 4.78.

Based upon a stellar classification of A6 IV by Cowley et al. (1969), this is an A-type subgiant star that has consumed the hydrogen at its core and is evolving away from the main sequence. Older studies had it classed as an A-type main-sequence star with a class of A7 V. At the age of 307 million years, it has a high rate of spin, revolving upon its axis once every 1.278 days. It is a Delta Scuti variable with 1.75 times the mass of the Sun and 2.2 times the Sun's radius. The star is radiating 19 times the Sun's luminosity from its photosphere at an effective temperature of 8,274 K.

Due to its location near the ecliptic, this star is subject to lunar occultations. These events have provided occasional, but not definitive, evidence of a close secondary companion.

See also
 Taurus (Chinese astronomy)
 List of stars in Taurus

References

A-type subgiants
Delta Scuti variables
Triple stars
Taurus (constellation)
Durchmusterung objects
Gliese and GJ objects
028527
021029
1427
Suspected variables